Azails is a town and commune in Tlemcen Province in northwestern Algeria.  It is situated around 27 km southwest from Tlemcen.

References

Communes of Tlemcen Province